Bob Gazzard (born 26 September 1935) is  a former Australian rules footballer who played with Geelong in the Victorian Football League (VFL).

Notes

External links 
		

Living people
1935 births
Australian rules footballers from Victoria (Australia)
Geelong Football Club players
Colac Football Club players